The  (lit. Superior Audiovisual Council), abbreviated CSA, was a French institution created in 1989 whose role was to regulate the various electronic media in France, such as radio and television.

The CSA always acted after content was shown on a TV channel or heard on a radio, so it was not a censorship instance. Notably, the CSA asked the Government of France to forbid Al-Manar TV in 2005 because of charges of hate speech; it also claimed that MED TV was close to the Kurdish PKK, on grounds not of "evidences" but of "concording elements".

On September 24, 2019, Franck Riester announced that the bill relating to audiovisual communication and cultural sovereignty in the digital age examined by the National Assembly in the first half of 2020 would include the merger of the CSA and HADOPI to form the Regulatory Authority for Audiovisual and Digital Communication (ARCOM). The bill is put on hold until April 8, 2022 when it is presented to the Council of Ministers under the name "bill relating to the regulation and protection of access to cultural works in the digital age". The merger became effective on January 1, 2022.

Last members
(as of December 2021)
 Roch-Olivier Maistre (president)
 Carole Bienaimé-Besse
 Nicolas Curien
 Hervé Godechot
 Michèle Léridon
 Jean-François Mary
 Nathalie Sonnac

Pictograms 
The following pictograms are proposed to the different TV channels. Channels are responsible for displaying the right pictogram depending on the show and its time of broadcast. Note that –18 can be either non-pornographic (like the movie Ken Park) or pornographic.

See also 
 Pirate radio in France

References

External links
 

Mass media in France
Entertainment rating organizations
Government agencies of France
1989 establishments in France
Government agencies established in 1989